Sərkar (also, Sarkyar) is a village and municipality in the Samukh Rayon of Azerbaijan.  It has a population of 4,850.

References 

Populated places in Samukh District